Saphenista carchiana is a species of moth of the family Tortricidae. It is found in Carchi Province, Ecuador.

The wingspan is 12–13 mm. The ground colour of the forewings is glossy white with indistinct brownish suffusions, mainly along the basal half of the costa. The hindwings are creamy white, but paler basally.

References

Moths described in 2002
Saphenista